Wessel may refer to:

 Wessel (name), including a list of people with the name
 Wessel Islands, a group of islands forming part of the Northern Territory, Australia, named after the Dutch ship Wesel in 1636
 Cape Wessel, the most northerly point of Rimbija Island (itself the northernmost of the Wessel Islands)
 Wessels plass, a square in Oslo, Norway